The Njarðvík men's basketball team, commonly known as Njarðvík or UMFN, is the men's basketball department of Ungmennafélag Njarðvíkur, based in the town of Reykjanesbær in Iceland. It is one of the most successful men's team in Icelandic basketball, winning 17 national championships. The team, then known as Íþróttafélag Keflavíkurflugvallar (ÍKF), was one of the founding members of the Icelandic top league in 1952 and won the first Icelandic men's championship that same year. In 1969 the team merged into Ungmennafélag Njarðvíkur and became its basketball department.

Njarðvík also has a men's reserve team that plays in the amateur level Icelandic 3rd-tier Division II, called Njarðvík-b.

Rivalries

Keflavík
The rivalry between the two teams from the neighbouring towns of Keflavík and Njarðvík began in earnest when Keflavík ÍF won its first national championship in 1989. From 1991 to 2010, the teams faced three times in the Úrvalsdeild finals and four times in the Icelandic Cup final.

Colours
The original uniform colours of the club were blue and white. In late 1973 the basketball department was in need of new uniforms and due to lack of funds they decided to select a colour that no other team was using, so they wouldn't have to buy two sets of uniforms. There were three colours to choose from but as the three selectors were all Boston Celtics fans they decided to choose green uniforms. The green colour has been in use since then, except for the 1989-90 season when they played in the orange colour of its biggest sponsor, Hagkaup.

Arena
Njarðvík plays its home games at Íþróttahús Njarðvíkur, commonly nicknamed Ljónagryfjan (English: The Lion's Den) since at least 1976. In July 2019, Njarðvík signed a 2-year sponsorship deal with Njarðtak, naming the arena the Njarðtaks-gryfjan (English: The Njarðtak's Den).

European record

Trophies and awards

Trophies
Úrvalsdeild karla
 Winners (17): 19521, 19531, 19561, 19581, 1981, 1982, 1984, 1985, 1986, 1987, 1991, 1994, 1995, 1998, 2001, 2002, 2006

Icelandic Basketball Cup
 Winners (9): 1987, 1988, 1989, 1990, 1992, 1999, 2002, 2005, 2021

Icelandic Super Cup
 Winners (7): 1995, 1999, 2001, 2002, 2004, 2005, 2006

Company Cup
 Winners (3): 2001, 2003, 2005

Division I
 Winners (3): 19651, 19691, 1972

As ÍKF

Individual awards

Icelandic Cup Finals MVP
Jóhannes Kristbjörnsson – 1987

Notable players

Head coaches

 Gene Crowley and John Wahl 1952
 Guðmundur Þorsteinsson 1971
 Hilmar Hafsteinsson 1978–1979
 Theodore Bee 1979–1980
 Danny Shouse 1980–1981
 Hilmar Hafsteinsson 1981–1982
 Alex Gilbert 1982
 Gunnar Þorvarðarson 1982
 Bill Kotterman 1982–1983
 Gunnar Þorvarðarson 1983–1986
 Valur Ingimundarson 1986–1988
 Chris Fadness 1988–1989
 Gunnar Þorvarðarson 1989
 Árni Lárusson 1989–1990
 Friðrik Ingi Rúnarsson 1990–1992
 Paul Colton 1992
 Teitur Örlygsson 1992–1993
 Valur Ingimundarson 1993–1995
 Hrannar Hólm 1995–1996
 Ástþór Ingason 1997
 Friðrik Ingi Rúnarsson 1997–2000
 Friðrik Ragnarsson and Teitur Örlygsson 2000–2001
 Friðrik Ragnarsson 2001–2004
 Einar Árni Jóhannsson 2004–2007
 Teitur Örlygsson 2007–2008
 Valur Ingimundarson 2008–2009
 Sigurður Ingimundarson 2009–2011
 Einar Árni Jóhannsson and Friðrik Ragnarsson 2011–2012
 Einar Árni Jóhannsson 2012–2014
 Friðrik Ingi Rúnarsson 2014–2016
 Daníel Guðni Guðmundsson 2016–2018
 Einar Árni Jóhannsson 2018–2021
 Benedikt Guðmundsson 2021–present

References

Njarðvík (basketball)